The Valsøyfjord Hydroelectric Power Station is a hydroelectric power station in Valsøyfjord in the municipality of Heim in Trøndelag county, Norway. It stands downstream from the Grytdalen Hydroelectric Power Station and is a run-of-river plant that utilizes a  drop on the Grytåa River. The plant has an average annual production of about 17 GWh. The new plant came into operation in 1994, and is owned by Svorka Energi.

References

Hydroelectric power stations in Norway
Heim, Norway
Energy infrastructure completed in 1942
Energy infrastructure completed in 1994
1942 establishments in Norway